Luc Marat Abyla is a Gabonese politician. He is a member of the Gabonese Democratic Party (Parti démocratique gabonais, PDG), and is a Deputy in the National Assembly of Gabon. Currently he is the President of the PDG Parliamentary Group.

References

Members of the National Assembly of Gabon
Gabonese Democratic Party politicians
Living people
Year of birth missing (living people)
21st-century Gabonese people